Rawinia Ruth Higgins is a New Zealand academic whose research focuses on Māori language and culture.

Research 
Higgins' Master's thesis at the University of Otago was on the nature of transmission of oral histories, while her 2004 PhD thesis, was on the identity politics of female chin tattoos. She was the Head of School at Te Kawa a Māui, School of Maori Studies at Victoria University and was appointed Deputy Vice Chancellor Māori at Victoria University of Wellington in 2016. 

Higgins has written Māori material for Te Ara: The Encyclopedia of New Zealand. She has been a member of the Waitangi Tribunal since 2013, and is on the board of Te Māngai Pāho, the Māori Broadcast Funding Agency. She is currently Chair of the Māori Language Commission. Higgins has also served on the following boards, Te Kotahi a Tūhoe and the Tūhoe Fisheries Charitable Trust Board.

Honours and awards 
In November 2020, the Royal Society Te Apārangi awarded Higgins the Pou Aronui award for dedicated service to the humanities–aronui over a sustained period. In March 2021, Higgins was elected a Fellow of the Royal Society Te Apārangi, recognising "her scholarly contributions have made a significant impact in sharing new discourse, insights and understanding of mātauranga Māori and challenging cultural norms".

Personal life
Higgins is of Tūhoe descent.

References

Living people
Ngāi Tūhoe people
University of Otago alumni
Academic staff of the Victoria University of Wellington
Year of birth missing (living people)
Members of the Waitangi Tribunal
New Zealand Māori academics
New Zealand Māori women academics
Fellows of the Royal Society of New Zealand